Taham Rural District is in the Central District of Zanjan County, Zanjan province, Iran. At the National Census of 2006, its population was 3,336 in 827 households. There were 3,555 inhabitants in 909 households at the following census of 2011. At the most recent census of 2016, the population of the rural district was 2,578 in 811 households. The largest of its 13 villages was Taham, with 1,073 people.

References 

Zanjan County

Rural Districts of Zanjan Province

Populated places in Zanjan Province

Populated places in Zanjan County